"Night People" is a song by the British synthpop group The Human League, released on 22 November 2010. The track failed to chart.

The single features remixes from Cerrone, Mylo, Emperor Machine and Villa. The single reached No. 25 in the BBC Radio 1 Top 30 Indie Singles Chart.

Dave Simpson of The Guardian said of the song, "Stark synthesisers, an instantly memorable hookline and lyrics about nightclubbing make for their best track in more than 20 years".

Simon Price of The Independent described Night People as "an exuberantly anthemic Human League classic."

Phil Oakey stated in a February 2011 interview that Night People "was not designed to go on the radio; it was designed to go into clubs, to have remixes but suddenly it’s a single and it got played on Radio 2."

References

The Human League songs
2010 singles
2010 songs
Songs written by Philip Oakey
Wall of Sound (record label) singles